The Mayoral election of 1973 in Pittsburgh, Pennsylvania was held on Tuesday, November 6, 1973. The incumbent mayor, Pete Flaherty of the Democratic Party chose to run for his second full term.

Primary Election
City Councilman Richard Caliguiri, a rising star in city politics (and future mayor) filed to run against Flaherty in the primary. Because Flaherty had long antagonized the remnants of the city's archaic Democratic machine, the aging party bosses endorsed Caliguiri, even though both Democratic candidates had similar legacies as a reformer. However, the popular mayor earned a moderate victory despite tepid support from insiders.

General Election
No Republicans filed to run in the primary; however, Flaherty won, by write-in, the Republican primary. The popular mayor received nearly 80% of his vote total on the Democratic line, which is in line with party registration in the city. A total of 67,550 votes were cast.

References

Pittsburgh
Pittsburgh
1973
1970s in Pittsburgh
November 1973 events in the United States